Celaenorrhinus nimba, commonly known as the Nimba sprite, is a species of butterfly in the family Hesperiidae. It is found in the Nimba Range of Ivory Coast. The habitat consists of forests.

References

Butterflies described in 2000
nimba